Gui Lin (born 1 October 1993 in Nanning, China) is a table tennis player from Brazil. She was naturalized as a Brazilian in 2012 and was selected to be part of the Brazilian National Team competing in table tennis at the 2012 Summer Olympics. She was awarded 2 silver medals in her sport during the 2015 Pan American Games. She currently trains under the supervision of Pan-American Medalist Hugo Hoyama. She also holds Chinese nationality.

Personal life
Lin has been living in Brazil since the age of 12 as an exchange student and naturalized Brazilian at the age of 18. She speaks fluent Portuguese and identifies with Brazilian culture, claiming to be "Brazilian at heart from birth". She currently lives in São Bernardo do Campo where she trains with Hugo Hoyama, who, like her, identifies with soccer team Sociedade Esportiva Palmeiras. She held a relationship with soccer player Chen Zhizhao.

Criticism
She has been the target of criticism for being selected over Jessica Yamada to be the third player on the Brazilian Team for the 2012 Olympic Games despite being lower-ranked at the time. The Brazilian Team coach argued that his choice for Lin was technical, stating that Lin was currently the best Brazilian player overall and was lower-ranked due to injuries in the previous season, which made her unable to play and consequently dropping positions on the ranking.

References

Living people
1993 births
People from Nanning
Brazilian female table tennis players
Chinese emigrants to Brazil
Table tennis players at the 2012 Summer Olympics
Table tennis players at the 2016 Summer Olympics
Naturalized citizens of Brazil
Olympic table tennis players of Brazil
Pan American Games silver medalists for Brazil
Pan American Games medalists in table tennis
Table tennis players from Guangxi
Naturalised table tennis players
South American Games gold medalists for Brazil
South American Games silver medalists for Brazil
South American Games medalists in table tennis
Table tennis players at the 2015 Pan American Games
Competitors at the 2018 South American Games
Medalists at the 2015 Pan American Games

Brazilian people of Chinese descent